The Parliaments of the Australian states and territories are legislative bodies within the federal framework of the Commonwealth of Australia.

All the parliaments are based on the Westminster system, and each is regulated by its own constitution. Queensland and the two territories have unicameral parliaments, with the single house being called Legislative Assembly. The other states have a bicameral parliament, with a lower house called the Legislative Assembly (New South Wales, Victoria and Western Australia) or House of Assembly (South Australia and Tasmania), and an upper house called the Legislative Council.

Unlike the Parliament of Australia Section 44 of the Constitution of Australia which prevents persons with dual citizenship to be in Parliament, In state Parliaments they have no laws preventing dual citizenship.

Background
Before the formation of the Commonwealth in 1901, the six Australian colonies were self-governing colonies, with parliaments which had come into existence at various times between 1825, when the New South Wales Legislative Council was created, to 1891, when Western Australia became the last of the colonies to gain full self-government.

The colonies ratified the Constitution of Australia, becoming States of the Commonwealth in the new federation, and ceding certain of their legislative powers to the Commonwealth Parliament, but otherwise retaining their self-governing status with their own constitutions and parliaments. The state parliaments were all created by legislation of the British Imperial Parliament, and their original constitutions were contained in Acts of that Parliament; however now the power to amend state constitutions resides with the respective state parliaments, in accordance with its constitution. The Commonwealth Parliament cannot amend a state's constitution.

The Australian Capital Territory and the Northern Territory, by contrast, are territories of the Commonwealth, and their parliaments were created by way of legislation of the Commonwealth Parliament. Although the Commonwealth treats the territories as though they were states for many purposes, they are not states, and the legislative powers of their parliaments can be altered or even abolished by the Commonwealth Parliament. The Commonwealth can also overturn legislation passed by the territory parliaments.

Overview

States and territories

New South Wales

The Parliament of New South Wales is a bicameral legislature comprising the New South Wales Legislative Council, the Legislative Assembly and the King, represented by the Governor of New South Wales. The Legislative Council has 42 members elected for eight-year terms with half the members facing re-election every four years. The Legislative Council cannot block appropriation bills. They are elected by proportional voting with the whole state being one electorate. The Legislative Assembly has 93 members elected for four-year terms from single-member constituencies, using optional preferential voting.

Victoria

The Parliament of Victoria is a bicameral legislature comprising the Victorian Legislative Council, the Legislative Assembly and the King, represented by the Governor of Victoria. The Legislative Council has 40 members, elected for four-year terms, elected from eight multi-member constituencies, each with five members, using proportional voting. The Legislative Assembly has 88 members elected for fixed four-year terms from single-member constituencies, using preferential voting. Voting is compulsory, and elections take place on the last Saturday of November every four years.

Queensland

The Parliament of Queensland is a unicameral legislature comprising the Legislative Assembly and the King, represented by the Governor of Queensland. The Legislative Assembly has 93 members elected for fixed four-year terms in single-member constituencies using preferential voting. Voting is compulsory, and elections take place on the last Saturday of October every four years.

South Australia

The Parliament of South Australia is a bicameral legislature comprising the South Australian Legislative Council and the House of Assembly. According to the South Australian Constitution, unlike the Federal Parliament, and the parliaments of the other states and territories of Australia, neither the Sovereign nor the Governor is considered to be a part of the South Australian Parliament. The Legislative Council has 22 members, elected for eight-year terms by proportional voting with half the members facing re-election every four years, and the House of Assembly which has 47 members, elected for four-year terms from single-member constituencies, using preferential voting. Voting is compulsory.

Western Australia

The Parliament of Western Australia is a bicameral legislature comprising the Western Australian Legislative Council, the Legislative Assembly and the King, represented by the Governor of Western Australia. The Legislative Council has 36 members, elected for fixed four-year terms from six multi-member electoral regions by "community of interest" —3 metropolitan and 3 rural—each electing 6 members by proportional voting. There is a significant malapportionment in the Legislative Council in favour of rural regions. The Legislative Assembly has 59 members, elected for fixed four-year terms from single-member constituencies, using preferential voting. Voting is compulsory, with elections being held every four years on the second Saturday in March, though the term of the Legislative Council does not expire until May after the election.

Tasmania

The Parliament of Tasmania is a bicameral legislature comprising the Tasmanian Legislative Council, the House of Assembly and the Governor of Tasmania. The Legislative Council has 15 members, elected for six-year terms, elected from single-member constituencies on a rotational basis with either two or three being elected each year, using full preferential voting. The House of Assembly has 25 members elected for four-year terms from multi-member constituencies, using the Hare-Clark system of proportional representation. Voting is compulsory.

Australian Capital Territory

The Australian Capital Territory Legislative Assembly has 25 members, elected for four-year terms from multi-member constituencies, using the Hare-Clark system of proportional voting.

Northern Territory

The Northern Territory Legislative Assembly is a unicameral legislature. The Legislative Assembly has 25 members, elected for four-year terms from single-member constituencies, using preferential voting. The head of government is called the Chief Minister, while the Administrator of the Northern Territory (appointed by the federal government) forms a similar role to state governors in providing assent to legislation.

Norfolk Island

In the external territory of Norfolk Island located in the South Pacific Ocean, the local legislative body is the Norfolk Island Regional Council, established in 2016. The island was previously governed by a Norfolk Legislative Assembly. Formed after the Norfolk Island Act 1979 was passed in the Australian parliament, its first members were elected on the tenth of August 1979. The assembly consisted of 9 members elected every three years by popular vote. It was abolished in June 2015 as part of a reorganisation of the territory's government by the Parliament of Australia.

Christmas Island

In the external territory of Christmas Island in the Indian Ocean, the Shire Council provides local governance. The nine-member Shire Council was established in 1993. Councilors serve four-year terms, with four or five being chosen every second year.

Cocos (Keeling) Islands

In the external territory of the Cocos (Keeling) Islands in the Indian Ocean, the Shire of Cocos is the local legislative body. Established in 1993, the Shire Council consists of 7 members serving terms of four years. Elections for half the seats are held every two years.

Current compositions

See also
 Electoral systems of the Australian states and territories
 Members of multiple Australian legislatures

References

External links
 The New South Wales Parliament
 The Queensland Parliament
 The South Australian Parliament
 The Tasmanian Parliament
 The Victorian Parliament
 The Western Australian Parliament
 The Australian Capital Territory Legislative Assembly 
 The Northern Territory Legislative Assembly

 
Politics of Australia